Benivar may refer to:
 Benivar-e Olya
 Benivar-e Sofla
 Benivar-e Vosta

See also
 Benvar (disambiguation)